2008–09 Hong Kong Third Division League is the 7th season since the establishment of Hong Kong Third Division "District" League.

League tables

Third "A"

Third "District"

Final Round

Elimination Playoff

Hong Kong Third Division League seasons
3